Shaohao or Shao Hao ( "Lesser Brightness"), also known Jin Tian (金天), was a legendary Chinese sovereign. Shaohao is usually identified as a son of the Yellow Emperor. According to some traditions (for example the Book of Documents), he is a member of the Five Emperors.

The historicity of Shaohao is controversial. The Doubting Antiquity School of historians represented by Gu Jiegang posit that Shaohao was added to the orthodox legendary succession by Liu Xin as part of a political campaign of revisions to ancient texts around the 1st century AD.

Orthodox Legend
The usually accepted version of his life, the provenance of which can only be reliably traced to the Han Dynasty from the 1st century AD onwards, posits that Shaohao is a son of the Yellow Emperor. He was the leader of the Dongyi, whose capital he shifted to Qufu, Shandong. Ruling for eighty-four years, he was succeeded by his nephew Zhuanxu, the son of his brother Changyi.

However, Shiji listed no emperor between the Yellow Emperor and Zhuanxu. Shaohao is mentioned as a person living between the two who was fretting over an incompetent son, who was derided as Qiongji (窮奇; literally "Extremely Odd").  If Shaohao were to be identified with Xuanxiao (Hanzi:玄囂), the oldest son of the Yellow Emperor found earlier in the text; the incompetent Qiongji would be identified with Jiaoji (Hanzi:蟜極), Xuanxiao's only known offspring, who was also passed over as emperor.  Jiaoji's son, Ku, and grandsons (Zhi and Yao) would become emperors though.

Shaohao's tomb, most likely built during the Song dynasty, is traditionally located in present-day Jiuxian ("old prefecture") village, on the eastern outskirts of Qufu. The tomb enclosure also includes a pyramidal monument called Shou Qiu, which according to legend was the birthplace of the Yellow Emperor.

Legends with alternative origin
A different legend, in the Bamboo Annals (019), posits that Shaohao was not the Yellow Emperor's son but the son of a certain Lady Jie (Hanzi:女節), who miraculously conceived him after seeing a rainbow-like star flowing downwards onto the Hua islet (Hanzi: 華渚).

Another legend says that his mother, a weaver goddess, was a beautiful fairy named Huang'e who fell in love with the planet Venus while drifting along the Milky Way. The two enjoyed many intimate nights together on her raft and they created a son. She soon gave birth to Shaohao, who grew up to be a handsome young man with a lot of potential. His great uncle, the Yellow Emperor, was so impressed with him that he named him god of the Western Heavens.

The myth says that Shaohao created a kingdom in the five mountains of the Eastern Paradise that was inhabited by different types of birds. As the ruler of this bureaucratic land, he captured the identity of a vulture. Other birds worked below him, such as a phoenix as his Lord Chancellor, a hawk that delegated the law, and a pigeon that was in charge of education. He chose the four seasons of the year to watch over the remaining birds.

Although his kingdom was successful for many years, he moved back to the west and left his kingdom of birds to his son Chong. With a different son, Ru Shou, he made his home on Changliu Mountain, where he could rule over the Western Heavens. In union as father and son, they were responsible for the daily setting of the sun. In addition, Shaohao was thought to have introduced China to the twenty-five string lute.

Controversy over historicity
Whether Shaohao actually existed, or was a sovereign, is controversial. The Doubting Antiquity School of historians, represented by Gu Jiegang, posited that Shaohao was inserted into the orthodox legendary lineage of ancient rulers by Han Dynasty imperial librarian Liu Xin, as part of a wide-ranging campaign of editing ancient texts, in order to either justify the rule of the Han imperial house, or the brief Xin Dynasty that overthrew it. This theory posits that Liu Xin was keen to create a narrative of the succession of legendary kings and subsequent dynasties, which would satisfactorily reflect the "succession of five elements" theory of dynastic succession, as well as a rotation between different lineages, which would together legitimise the rule of the Han Dynasty and/or the succession by the Xin Dynasty.

There is debate whether that Shaohao was a real or legendary ruler of the Dongyi, a people who lived in eastern China. It is theorised that the worship of Shaohao was brought west by the Qin as they migrated west. Documentary evidence of Shaohao originates in the extant version of the ancient text Zuo Zhuan, but the lineage recited there, that includes Shaohao, is not corroborated by contemporaneous or earlier texts. The Doubting Antiquity School therefore theorises that Liu Xin took an existing but separate legendary figure, and inserted him into the legendary lineage of early rulers during his edit of the Zuo Zhuan. Whether, and at what point, Shaohao was inserted into the narrative of ancient Chinese rulers remains controversial amongst historians.

Shaohao and Kim Yu-sin
In the Korean Samguk Sagi, it was mentioned that Kim Yu-sin was a descendant of Shaohao.

References

Notes 

Three Sovereigns and Five Emperors
People from Qufu